David E. McMullin III (June 30, 1908 – September 15, 1995) was an American field hockey player who competed in the 1932 Summer Olympics and 1936 Summer Olympics.

In 1932 he was a member of the American field hockey team, which won the bronze medal. He played two matches as forward.

Four years later he was a member of the American field hockey team, which lost all three matches in the preliminary round and did not advance. He played three matches as forward.

He was born in Ambler, Pennsylvania and died in Newtown Square, Pennsylvania.

See also
List of Princeton University Olympians

External links
 
profile

1908 births
1995 deaths
People from Ambler, Pennsylvania
American male field hockey players
Field hockey players at the 1932 Summer Olympics
Field hockey players at the 1936 Summer Olympics
Olympic bronze medalists for the United States in field hockey
Medalists at the 1932 Summer Olympics